The women's pentathlon at the 1966 European Athletics Championships was held in Budapest, Hungary, at Népstadion on 1 September 1966.

Medalists

Results

Final
1 September

Participation
According to an unofficial count, 25 athletes from 19 countries participated in the event.

 (1)
 (1)
 (1)
 (1)
 (2)
 (1)
 (3)
 (1)
 (2)
 (1)
 (1)
 (1)
 (2)
 (1)
 (1)
 (1)
 (2)
 (1)
 (1)

References

Pentathlon
Combined events at the European Athletics Championships
Euro